Nieuwaal is a village in the Dutch province of Gelderland. It is a part of the municipality of Zaltbommel, and lies about 14 km east of Gorinchem.

It was first mentioned in 1146 as Nivelen, and either means "settlement near low-lying land" or "new house". The popular explanation Nieuw Waal (New Waal) is incorrect. In 1840, it was home to 326 people.

Gallery

References

Populated places in Gelderland
Zaltbommel